Chalakkudikkaran Changathi is a 2018 Indian Malayalam-language drama film directed by Vinayan and written by Ummer Muhammed from a story by Vinayan. It stars Senthil Krishna, Honey Rose, Dharmajan Bolgatty, and Salim Kumar. The film was inspired by the life story of Kalabhavan Mani.

Plot

The film is about the rise and fall of Rajamani, an autorickshaw driver from Chalakudy who made it big in Malayalam and Tamil cinema before he fell prey to his vices.

Cast

Music
Bijibal and Satheesh Babu composed the film's music. The lyrics were written by B. K. Harinarayanan.

Reception
Chalakkudikkaran Changathi was released in India on 28 September 2018.

The Times of India and Deccan Chronicle gave the film a rating of 3/5 and Mathrubhumi gave the film a rating of 2/5.

References

External links
 

2010s Malayalam-language films
2018 films
Indian biographical drama films
Films shot in Thrissur
Films shot in Chalakudy
2018 biographical drama films
Films directed by Vinayan